University Medical and Dental College Faisalabad is private medical college in Faisalabad, Pakistan. Owned by the Madina Foundation. University Medical and Dental College is the constituent college of the University of Faisalabad. It is affiliated with the  University of Health Sciences in Lahore, and is registered with the Pakistan Medical and Dental Council.  The college offers MBBS and BDS degrees.

References

External links

Universities and colleges in Faisalabad District
Medical colleges in Punjab, Pakistan
Dental schools in Pakistan